RIBA National Awards are part of an awards program operated by the Royal Institute of British Architects, also encompassing the Stirling Prize, the European Award and the International Award. The National Awards are given to buildings in the UK which are "recognised as significant contributions to architecture" which are chosen from the buildings to receive an RIBA Regional award.

The shortlist for each year's Stirling Prize is picked from recipients of that year's National Awards.

Award recipients

2008
The following buildings won a National Award in 2008:

BBC Scotland at Pacific Quay
Pier Art Centre
Hilton Tower
Manchester Civil Justice Centre
The Belgrade Theatre
Accordia
North Wall Arts Centre
East Beach Cafe

Adelaide Wharf
National Tennis Centre
Royal Festival Hall
The Sackler Crossing
St Marylebone Church of England School Performing Arts Facility
Terminal 5, Heathrow Airport
Wembley National Stadium
Westminster Academy at the Naim Dangoor Centre

2013
The following buildings won a National Award in 2013:

2014
The following buildings won a National Award in 2014:

2015
The following buildings won a National Award in 2015:

2016
The following buildings won a National Award in 2016:

2017
The following buildings won a National Award in 2017:

40 Chancery Lane – Bennetts Associates for Derwent London
8 Finsbury Circus – WilkinsonEyre for Mitsubishi Estate London and Stanhope
Barretts Grove – Amin Taha + Groupwork for Nick Grant
Bedales School Art and Design Building – Feilden Clegg Bradley Studios for Beadales School
Blackburn Meadows Biomass – BDP for E.ON Energy
British Airways i360 – Marks Barfield Architects for Brighton i360 Ltd
Caring Wood – James Macdonald Wright and Niall Maxwell for a private client
Carrowbreck Meadow – Hamson Barron Smith for Broadland Growth Ltd
Chetham's School of Music Stoller Hall – Stephenson Studio for Chetham's School of Music
City of Glasgow College City Campus – Reiach And Hall Architects and Michael Laird Architects for City of Glasgow College
Command of the Oceans – Baynes and Mitchell Architects for Chatham Historic Dockyard
Derwenthorpe Phase One – Studio Partington for Joseph Rowntree Housing Trust
Dujardin Mews – Karakusevic Carson with Maccreanor Lavington for the London Borough of Enfield
Dyson Campus Expansion – WilkinsonEyre for Dyson
Fallahogey Studio – McGarry-Moon Architects for McGarry-Moon Architects
Finlays Warehouse – Stephenson Studio for Facetspera Ltd
Hastings Pier – dRMM Architects for the Hastings Pier Charity
King's College School – Allies and Morrison for King's College School
Leicester Cathedral's Richard III Project 'With Dignity and Honour' – van Heyningen and Haward Architects for Leicester Cathedral
Live Works – Flanagan Lawrence for Live Theatre
Liverpool Philharmonic – Caruso St John Architects for Royal Liverpool Philharmonic
Magdalen College Library – Wright & Wright Architects for Magdalen College
Maggie's at the Robert Parfett Building – Foster + Partners for Maggie's
New Music Facilities for Wells Cathedral School – Eric Parry Architects for Wells Cathedral School
New Scotland Yard – Allford Hall Monaghan Morris for the Metropolitan Police Service

Newhouse of Auchengree – Ann Nisbet Studio for a private client
Number 49 – 31/44 Architects for a private client
Paradise Gardens – Lifschutz Davidson Sandilands for Ravenscourt Studios Ltd
Peacock House – BHSF Architekten with Studio-P for Jila and Andrew Peacock
Photography Studio – 6a architects for Juergen Teller Ltd
Remembrance Centre at the National Memorial Arboretum – Glenn Howells Architects for the National Memorial Arboretum
Rockvilla – Hoskins Architects for the National Theatre of Scotland
Shawm House – MawsonKerr Architects for Richard, Tony and Anne Pender
Silchester – Haworth Tompkins for Peabody
South Street – Sandy Rendel Architects for a private client
St Albans Abbey – Richard Griffiths Architects for the Cathedral and Abbey Church of St Alban
Tate Modern Blavatnik Building – Herzog & de Meuron for the Tate
The Berrow Foundation Building and New Garden at Lincoln College – Stanton Williams with Rodney Melville and Partners for Lincoln College, University of Oxford
The British Museum World Conservation and Exhibitions Centre – Roger Stirk Harbour + Partners for the British Museum
The Enterprise Centre, University of East Anglia – Archetype for Adapt Low Carbon Group and The University of East Anglia
The Laboratory, Dulwich College – Grimshaw for Dulwich College
The Loom – Duggan Morris Architects for Helical plc
The Welding Institute – Eric Parry Architects for TWI Ltd
The Word – FaulknerBrowns Architects for South Tyneside Council
Vajrasana Buddhist Retreat Centre – Walters & Cohen Architects for the London Buddhist Centre
Victoria Gate Arcades – ACME for Hammerson plc
Walmer Yard – Peter Salter and Associates with Mole Architects and John Comparelli Architects for a private client
Warwick Hall Community Centre – Acanthus Clews Architects for St John the Baptist Church, Burford
Wolfson Tree Management Centre – Invisible Studio for the Forestry Commission

2018
The following buildings won a National Award in 2018:

15 Clerkenwell Close – Amin Taha Architects and Groupwork for 15CC
25 Savile Row – Piercy&Company for Derwent London
53 Great Suffolk Street – Hawkins/Brown for Morgan Capital Partners
Albert Works – Cartwright Pickard Architects for City Estates
Bethnal Green Memorial – Arboreal Architecture for Stairway to Heaven Memorial Trust
Bloomberg London – Foster + Partners for Bloomberg
Boroughmuir High School – Allan Murray Architects for the Children & Families Department, City of Edinburgh Council
Bushey Cemetery – Waugh Thistleton Architects for The United Synagogue
Chadwick Hall – Henley Halebrown for the University of Roehampton
City of London Freemen's School Swimming Pool – Hawkins/Brown for City of London Freemen's School
Coastal House – 6a Architects for a private client
Durham Cathedral Open Treasure – Purcell for Durham Cathedral
Five Acre Barn – Blee Halligan for Five Acre Barn
Flexible House – Amin Taha + Groupwork for a private client
Gasholders London – WilkinsonEyre with Jonathan Tuckey Design for King's Cross Central Limited Partnership
King's Crescent Estate Phases 1 and 2 – Karakusevic Carson Architects and Henley Halebrown for the London Borough of Hackney
Kingsgate Primary Lower School – Maccreanor Lavington Architects for the London Borough of Camden
Knox Bhavan Studio – Knox Bhavan Architects for Simon Knox & Sasha Bhavan
Liverpool's Royal Court – Allford Hall Monaghan Morris for Royal Court Theatre Trust
Lochside House – HaysomWardMiller Architects for a private client
Maggie's Oldham – dRMM Architects for Maggie's
Marlborough Primary School – Dixon Jones for the Royal Borough of Kensington & Chelsea
New Tate, St Ives – Jamie Fobert Architects with Evans & Shalev for Tate St Ives
Nucleus, the Nuclear Decommissioning Authority and Caithness Archive – Reiarch and Hall Architects for the Nuclear Decommissioning Authority
Old Shed New House – Tonkin Liu for a private client
R7 King's Cross – Morris + Company and Weedon Architects for Argent LLP
Riverlight – Rogers Stirk Harbour + Partners and EPR Architects for St James Group Limited

Royal Academy of Music, The Susie Sainsbury Theatre and The Angela Burgess Recital Hall – Ian Ritchie Architects for the Royal Academy of Music
Royal Albert Wharf Phase 1 – Maccreanor Lavington for Notting Hill Housing Group
Royal Birmingham Conservatoire – Feilden Clegg Bradley Studios for Birmingham City University
Shaftesbury Theatre – Bennetts Associates for the Theatre of Comedy Company
Sibson Building – Penoyre & Prasad for University of Kent
St Augustines Church – Roz Barr Architects for the Order of St Augustine
St David's Hospice New In-patient Unit – KKE Architects for St David's Hospice Care
Storey's Field Centre and Eddington Nursery – MUMA LLP for University of Cambridge
Storyhouse – Bennetts Associates and Ellis Williams Architects for Cheshire West and Chester Council
The David Attenborough Building – Nicholas Hare Architects for University of Cambridge
The Department Store – Squire and Partners for Squire and Partners
The Leadenhall Building – Rogers Stirk Harbour + Partners for British Land
The Piece Hall and Calderdale Central Library and Archives – LDN Architects LLP for Calderdale Metropolitan Borough Council
The Sultan Nazrin Shah Centre – Niall McLaughlin Architects for Worcester College, Oxford
University of Birmingham Indoor Sports Centre – Lifschutz Davidson Sandilands for University of Birmingham
University of Roehampton Library – Feilden Clegg Bradley Studios for University of Roehampton
V&A Exhibition Road Quarter – AL_A for the Victoria and Albert Museum
Victoria Hall King's Cross – Stanton Williams for Aga Khan Development Network
Walthamstow Wetlands – Witherford Watson Mann Architects and Kinnear Landscape Architects for Waltham Forest Council
West Court Jesus College – Niall McLaughlin Architects for Jesus College, Cambridge
Weston Street – Allford Hall Monaghan Morris for Solidspace
White Collar Factory – Allford Hall Monaghan Morris for Derwent London

2019
The following buildings won a National Award in 2019:

2020
Due to the COVID-19 pandemic, the 2020 awards were postponed to 2021.

2021
The following buildings won a National Award in 2021:

2022
The following buildings won a National Award in 2022:

References

Royal Institute of British Architects
Architecture awards